Subway in the Sky is a 1959 British crime film directed by Muriel Box and starring Van Johnson, Hildegard Knef and Albert Lieven.  Hildegard Knef, who changed career in the 1960s to become a cabaret singer and songwriter, sings one song in the film, "It Isn't Love." It was shot at Shepperton Studios near London. The film's sets were designed by the art director George Provis.

Plot
Baxter Grant, an American soldier in West Berlin, deserts and goes on the run when faced with false drug trafficking and murder charges. He takes shelter with cabaret singer Lilli Hoffman, who he manages to persuade to help prove his innocence.

Cast
 Van Johnson as Major Baxter Grant
 Hildegard Knef as Lilli Hoffman
 Albert Lieven as Carl
 Cec Linder as Carson
 Katherine Kath as Anna Grant
 Vivian Matalon as Stefan Grant
 Carl Jaffe as German Detective
 Chuck Keyser as Sergeant Harwell
 Gaylord Cavallaro as Switchboard Operator
 Michael Bell as G.I.
 E. Kerrigan Prescott as Sentry
 James Maxwell as Officer
 Gerda Larsen as Air Stewardess
 Tom Watson as Corporal
 Edward Judd as Molloy
 Brian Wilde as Military Policeman

Critical reception
Leonard Maltin gave the film one and a half out of four stars, calling it a "flabby caper," regarding it a "terrible waste of (Hildegard) Neff's talents". Tony Sloman gave it three out of five stars in the Radio Times, calling it, "a film that wasn't highly regarded on its release, but thanks to its cast, subject matter and director bears re-evaluation today. (It) features two particularly watchable stars, both of whom have done better work than this. Ageing bobby-sox idol Van Johnson is a better actor than is generally acknowledged; he had a propensity for worried, introverted heroes...The director is Muriel Box, one of the few English women directors to have had a successful screen career, though here she struggles to keep the stage origins of the material hidden. Wilkie Cooper's stark black-and-white photography is excellent."

References

External links

1959 films
1959 crime films
Films directed by Muriel Box
Films set in Berlin
Films produced by Sydney Box
Films scored by Mario Nascimbene
British crime films
1950s English-language films
1950s British films
Films shot at Shepperton Studios
British Lion Films films